Mawu-Lisa (alternately: Mahu) is a creator goddess, associated with the Sun and Moon in Dahomey mythology. In some myths, she is the wife of the male god Lisa.  Mahu and Lisa are the children of Nana Buluku, and are the parents of Xevioso.

After creating the Earth and all life and everything else on it, she became concerned that it might be too heavy, so she asked the primeval serpent, Aido Hwedo, to curl up beneath the earth and thrust it up in the sky. When she asked Awe, a monkey she had also created, to help out and make some more animals out of clay, he boasted to the other animals and challenged Mawu-Lisa. Gbadu, the first woman Mawu-Lisa had created, saw all the chaos on earth and told her children to go out among the people and remind them that only Mawu-Lisa can give Sekpoli - the breath of life. Gbadu instructed her daughter, Minona, to go out among the people and teach them about the use of palm kernels as omens from Mawu-Lisa. When Awe, the arrogant monkey climbed up to the heavens to try to show Mawu-Lisa that he too could give life, he failed miserably. Lisa made him a bowl of porridge with the seed of death in it and reminded him that only she could give life and that she could also take it away.

Mawu-Lisa is similar to the figure Yemowo, a wife of the divinity Obatala, who is equivalent to "Lisa" (which is equivalent to "orisha."

References

Creator goddesses
Dahomean goddesses
Lunar goddesses
Solar goddesses
Voodoo goddesses
Names of God in African traditional religions